National Route 240 is a national highway of Japan connecting Kushiro, Hokkaidō and Abashiri, Hokkaidō in Japan, with a total length of 149 km (92.58 mi).

References

National highways in Japan
Roads in Hokkaido